Hwang Hee-Tae (born June 12, 1978 in Sinan County, Jeollanam-do) is a male South Korean Judoka.

He won a gold medal in the men's -90 kg division at the 2003 World Judo Championships in Osaka, Japan, by defeating the 2004 Olympic champion Zurab Zviadauri from Georgia in the final.  Hwang also won a gold medal at the Doha Asian Games in 2006.

At the Olympics, he competed in the -90 kg division in 2004, losing to Hiroshi Izumi in the semi-finals and then to Khasanbi Taov in the bronze medal bout.  In 2012, he competed in the -100 kg division, where he again reached the semi-final, this time losing Tuvshinbayar Naidan.  He then lost to Henk Grol in the bronze medal bout.

References

External links
 
 

Judoka at the 2004 Summer Olympics
Judoka at the 2012 Summer Olympics
Olympic judoka of South Korea
1978 births
Living people
Asian Games medalists in judo
Judoka at the 2006 Asian Games
Judoka at the 2010 Asian Games
South Korean male judoka
Asian Games gold medalists for South Korea
Medalists at the 2006 Asian Games
Medalists at the 2010 Asian Games
Universiade medalists in judo
Universiade bronze medalists for South Korea
Sportspeople from South Jeolla Province
21st-century South Korean people